Phyllosticta coffeicola is a fungal plant pathogen infecting coffee.

References

External links
 USDA ARS Fungal Database

Fungal plant pathogens and diseases
Coffee diseases
coffeicola
Fungi described in 1896